1888 Central Cumberland colonial by-election may refer to 

 1888 Central Cumberland colonial by-election 1 held on 14 March 1888
 1888 Central Cumberland colonial by-election 2 held on 14 May 1888

See also
 List of New South Wales state by-elections